Seyyid Hasan Pasha (died 1748) was an Ottoman grand vizier in the 18th century.

He was a Turk from Reşadiye, today in Tokat Province, Turkey. He attended the Janissary corps in Istanbul. After several promotions, he was appointed as the Agha of the Janissaries, the highest rank in the army in 1739. The same year, he took part in the Battle of Grocka, where he distinguished himself as a capable leader and fighter. Three years later, on October 4, 1742, he was appointed as the grand vizier. Although he spent almost four years in the office, he wasn't successful in civil administration and he was dismissed by the sultan on August 10, 1746. However, as was the case for many former grand viziers, he continued as a governor in several different parts of the Ottoman Empire. He became the governor of the island of Rhodes (now in Greece), İçel (modern Mersin Province, Turkey), and Diyarbakır. He died in December 1748.

His son, Seyyid Abdullah Pasha, also served as grand vizier one term after him.

See also
List of Ottoman Grand Viziers

References

18th-century Grand Viziers of the Ottoman Empire
1748 deaths
Year of birth unknown
People from Reşadiye
Janissaries